"Revival" is the lead single from Deerhunter's fourth studio effort, Halcyon Digest. The track became available for download via an official email link on July 21, 2010. A 7" pressed on white vinyl was released August 24, 2010 in a limited set of 350. The download contained the tracks along with directions to make a DIY style single, along with disc and back artwork.

Track listing
 "Revival" - 2:13
 "Primitive 3D" - 3:07

Personnel
Deerhunter
Moses Archuleta – drums
Bradford J. Cox – lead vocals, guitar
Joshua Fauver – bass
Lockett Pundt – guitar

References

2010 singles
4AD singles
Deerhunter songs
2010 songs